Bačík (feminine: Bačíková) is a Czech and Slovak surname. Notable people with the surname include:

 Alžbeta Bačíková (born 1990), Slovak cyclist
 Charles Bacik (1910–1991), Czech-Irish glass manufacturer
 Ivana Bacik (born 1968), Irish politician
 Ladislav Bačík (1933–2016), Slovak swimmer
 Martin Bačík (born 1989), Czech football player
 Patrik Bačík (born 1995), Slovak ice hockey player
 Roman Bačík (born 1959), Slovak water polo player

Czech-language surnames
Slovak-language surnames